St Mary's Senior High School is an all female second cycle institution in Korle Gonno in the Greater Accra Region, Ghana.

History
St. Mary's Senior High School  was established on 6 February 1950 by the Catholic missionary sisters known as Sister Servants of the Holy Spirit(SSPS).The school started with ten girls and a staff of two(2) Reverend sisters namely: the late Reverend Sisters, Jane and Rosette. 
 
The school has an alliance with Accra Academy, which is seen as the brother school of St. Mary's Senior High School. This  alliance is aimed at promoting intellectual development between students of both institutions. Their alliance involves the sharing of social gatherings and entertainment.

Headmistresses

 Rev. Sr. Jane(1950-1953)
 Rev. Mother Bernadette(1953-1954)
 Rev. Sr. Pierre(1955 - 1968)
 Rev. Sr. Mary Grace(1968 - 1970)
 Rev. Sr. Ruth  (1970-1980)
 Mrs. Elizabeth Joyce Sowah(1980-2001)
 Mrs. Victoria Opoku (2001-2002)
 Miss Doris Bramson(2002 to 2017)
 Mrs. Grace Mansa Eshun(2017 to 2021)
 Mrs. Philomena Owusu-Ansah Barnes(2021 to date)

Achievements
 Won the 2007 Sprite Ball Championship

Notable alumni 
Dzifa Affainie- Television presenter and anchor
Shirley Ayorkor Botchway (born 1963) - current Foreign Minister of Ghana.
Ophelia Crossland- Ghanaian fashion designer and Creative director 
Christabel Ekeh (born 1990) - actress
Jean Adukwei Mensa - Chairperson of Electoral Commission, former Executive Director of the Institute of Economic Affairs, Legon.
 MzVee (born 1992) - Ghanaian Musician.
Rita Korankye Ankrah - Wife of Sam Korankye Ankrah
Goski Alabi - Ghanaian academic, Professor of Quality Management and Leadership at University of Professional Studies Accra (UPSA)
Velma Owusu-Bempah, Ghanaian milliner and accessories designer

See also
 PeaceJam Ghana 
 Sprite Ball Championship

References

High schools in Ghana
Greater Accra Region
Girls' schools in Ghana
Educational institutions established in 1987
Boarding schools in Ghana
1987 establishments in Ghana